RadioTAB is a radio station primarily covering horse and greyhound racing in Australia and internationally, operated by Tabcorp, which operates the Totalisator Agency Boards based in Queensland, Tasmania, South Australia and Northern Territory.  RadioTAB's studios are in Brisbane City.

History 
4TAB commenced 1 January 1992. The official opening was conducted on air on 23 January 1992.

Prior to the licence being bought by the TAB, the station was known as 4IP. It commenced in 1935. Between 1965 and 1977, 4IP had a most successful hit music format in Brisbane, and was aligned with its Melbourne and Sydney cousins 3XY and 2SM. In the 1980s, FM radio started making inroads into 4IP's popularity it changed its callsign to 4IO and adopted a slogan of Radio 10, then Stereo 10 and later "Light and Easy 1008".

Programming 
The station's breakfast show airs daily from 5am, providing listeners with the latest sporting news and results from a variety of sports and codes.

The station's morning shows "Racing Active" is presented from 8:30am Monday to Friday (AEST), and "Select Racing" from 7am on Saturdays and Sundays. The programs feature interviews and racing news, as well as previews of race meetings being covered on that day. It also features racing broadcasts from Australian and international venues when scheduled. Special feature or code specific segments for Harness and Greyhound racing are also featured.

The majority of RadioTAB's programming is a continuous broadcast of thoroughbred, harness and greyhound racing. This occurs daily from 11:30am. While overnight from 2am, a shared programme is taken from Sky Racing.

Following the merger of Tatts Group, which operated RadioTAB for its jurisdictions (its wagering services then styled UBET), with fellow wagering and gaming operator Tabcorp, RadioTAB is now a sister station to Sydney-based Sky Sports Radio. Both stations have retained their separate identities as of 2021.

References

See also 
 Sky Sports Radio, the Tabcorp-owned racing station in New South Wales and the Australian Capital Territory
 RSN Racing & Sport, a racing station operating in Victoria
 TABradio, a station owned by Racing and Wagering Western Australia

Radio stations in Queensland
Radio stations in Brisbane
Radio stations in Tasmania
Radio stations in Hobart
Radio stations in Darwin, Northern Territory
Radio stations in the Northern Territory
Radio stations in Adelaide
Radio stations in South Australia
Sports radio stations in Australia